Anguillan Creole is a dialect of Leeward Caribbean Creole English spoken in Anguilla, an island and British Overseas Territory in the Caribbean. Although classified as a dialect of Leeward Caribbean Creole English spoken in Saint Kitts and Nevis, Antigua and Montserrat due to a common British colonial history, it is actually closer to the British Virgin Islands and Saint Martin varieties of Virgin Islands Creole. The number of speakers of Anguillan Creole is below 10,000. Anguillan Creole does not have the status of an official language.

References

Society of Anguilla
English-based pidgins and creoles
English language in the Caribbean
Languages of the United Kingdom
Languages of the African diaspora
Creoles of the Caribbean